Maria Byrne (born 27 November 1967) is an Irish Fine Gael politician who has served as a Senator for the Agricultural Panel since April 2021. She was previously a senator from 2016 to 2020.

She previously served as a member of Limerick City and County Council from 1999 up until her election to Seanad Éireann. During her time on the Council, she also served as Mayor of Limerick from 2010 to 2011.

She was the Fine Gael Seanad Spokesperson for Education and Skills. She lost her seat at the 2020 Seanad election, but was a successful candidate at the 2021 Seanad by-elections.

References

External links
Maria Byrne's page on the Fine Gael website

1967 births
Living people
Fine Gael senators
Members of the 25th Seanad
Members of the 26th Seanad
21st-century women members of Seanad Éireann
Politicians from County Limerick
Local councillors in County Limerick